Garrison is a city in Benton County, Iowa, United States. The population was 344 at the time of the 2020 census. It is part of the Cedar Rapids Metropolitan Statistical Area.

It was named for the farmer, Nelson Garrison, who had the post office in his home west of town. He owned the property.(1872).

Geography

Demographics

2010 census
As of the census of 2010, there were 371 people, 145 households, and 99 families living in the city. The racial makeup of the city was 96.2% White, 1.1% African American, 0.3% from other races, and 2.4% from two or more races. Hispanic or Latino of any race were 1.6% of the population.

There were 145 households, of which 34.5% had children under the age of 18 living with them, 50.3% were married couples living together, 11.7% had a female householder with no husband present, 6.2% had a male householder with no wife present, and 31.7% were non-families. 22.8% of all households were made up of individuals, and 11% had someone living alone who was 65 years of age or older. The average household size was 2.56 and the average family size was 2.90.

The median age in the city was 40.3 years. 24.5% of residents were under the age of 18; 8.7% were between the ages of 18 and 24; 24.3% were from 25 to 44; 29.1% were from 45 to 64; and 13.5% were 65 years of age or older. The gender makeup of the city was 47.4% male and 52.6% female.

2000 census
As of the census of 2000, there were 413 people, 159 households, and 113 families living in the city. The racial makeup of the city was 97.82% White, 0.24% African American, 0.73% Asian, 0.24% from other races, and 0.97% from two or more races. Hispanic or Latino of any race were 1.69% of the population.

There were 159 households, out of which 32.7% had children under the age of 18 living with them, 58.5% were married couples living together, 11.3% had a female householder with no husband present, and 28.9% were non-families. 25.2% of all households were made up of individuals, and 10.1% had someone living alone who was 65 years of age or older. The average household size was 2.60 and the average family size was 3.16.

In the city, the population was spread out, with 28.6% under the age of 18, 7.7% from 18 to 24, 27.6% from 25 to 44, 24.5% from 45 to 64, and 11.6% who were 65 years of age or older. The median age was 36 years. For every 100 females, there were 93.9 males. For every 100 females age 18 and over, there were 95.4 males.

The median income for a household in the city was $187,485, and the median income for a family was $215,983. Males had a median income of $205,423 versus $164,824 for females. The per capita income for the city was $126,857. About 10.5% of families and 13.0% of the population were below the poverty line, including 22.2% of those under age 18 and 16.7% of those age 65 or over.

Arts and culture
The Old Creamery Theatre Company is a not-for-profit professional theatre founded in 1971 in Garrison. Ten theatre colleagues formed the company in a vacant building that had once served the community of Garrison as a co-op dairy.

Education
The Vinton-Shellsburg Community School District operates public schools. The district was established on July 1, 1993 by the merger of the Vinton Community School District and the Shellsburg Community School District. The city was served by the Garrison school district until July 1, 1969, when it merged into the Vinton school district.

References

Further reading
Little Heathens: Hard Times and High Spirits on an Iowa Farm During the Great Depression (2007), by Mildred Armstrong Kalish.  The book describes "a time, a place, and a way of life long gone."

External links

  
City-Data Comprehensive Statistical Data and more about Garrison

Cities in Benton County, Iowa
Cities in Iowa
Cedar Rapids, Iowa metropolitan area